Biren and Biron is an English and Indian given name and an English surname. Notable people with the name include:

Given name
Biren Basnet (born 1994), Bhutanese footballer
Biren De (1926–2011), Indian painter
Biren Deka (born 1947), Indian politician
Biren Dutta (1910–1992), Indian politician
Biren Ealy (born 1984), American football player
Biren Sing Engti (born 1945), Indian politician
Biren Mitra (1917–1978), Indian politician
Biren Jyoti Mohanty, Indian film editor
Biren Nag, Indian film director
Biren Roy (born 1910), Indian politician
Biren Sikder (born 1949), Bengali politician
Biron House (1884–1930), English cricketer

Middle name

 N. Biren Singh (born 1961), Indian politician

Surname

 Huang Biren (born 1969), Singaporean actress
 Joan E. Biren (born 1944), American artist

See also
Papestra biren, a moth of the family Noctuidae
Biren Technology, a Chinese semiconductor company
Bireuën
Birken (disambiguation)
Birn (disambiguation)